Mark Wayne "Markwayne" Mullin (born July 26, 1977) is an American businessman and politician who has served as the junior United States senator from Oklahoma since 2023. A member of the Republican Party, he was elected in a special election in 2022 to serve the remainder of Jim Inhofe's term. Mullin is the first Native American U.S. senator since Ben Nighthorse Campbell retired in 2005. He is also the second Cherokee Nation citizen elected to the Senate; the first, Robert Latham Owen, retired in 1925.

Early life, education, and businesses
Mullin was born on July 26, 1977, in Tulsa, Oklahoma, the youngest of the seven children of Jim Martin and Brenda Gayle Morris Mullin, of Westville, Oklahoma.

He graduated from Stilwell High School in Stilwell, Oklahoma. He attended Missouri Valley College in 1996, but did not graduate. In 1997, at age 20, Mullin took over his father's business, Mullin Plumbing, when his father fell ill.

In 2010, Mullin received an associate degree in construction technology from Oklahoma State University Institute of Technology.

At the time he was first elected to Congress in 2012, Mullin hosted House Talk, a home improvement radio program syndicated across Oklahoma, on Tulsa station KFAQ.

When elected to Congress, Mullin owned Mullin Properties, Mullin Farms, and Mullin Services, in addition to Mullin Plumbing. In 2012, he reported between $200,000 and $2 million in income from two family companies, and another $15,000 to $50,000 from shares he held in a bank. 

At the end of 2021, Mullin's reported assets increased to a range of $31.6 million to $75.6 million, compared to a range of $7.3 million to $29.9 million at the end of 2020. The increase was from the sale of his plumbing-related companies to HomeTown Services, a multi-state residential heating, air conditioning, plumbing and electrical company. Mullin said that the sale happened in early 2021, shortly after Jim Inhofe was reelected to the U.S. Senate in 2020.

U.S. House of Representatives

Elections

2012 

In June 2011, incumbent U.S. Representative Dan Boren announced that he would retire at the end of 2012. In September 2011, Mullin declared his candidacy for the 2012 elections to the United States House of Representatives to represent Oklahoma's 2nd congressional district. Mullin branded himself as an outsider; his campaign slogan was "A rancher. A businessman. Not a politician!" In the six-candidate Republican primary, Mullin finished first with 42% of the vote; state representative George Faught ranked second with 23% of the vote. In the primary runoff election, Mullin defeated Faught, 57%–43%.

Oklahoma's 2nd congressional district had historically been a "Yellow Dog" Democratic district, but had steadily trended Republican as Tulsa's suburbs spilled into its northern portion. For this reason, Mullin was thought to have a good chance of winning the election. He defeated the Democratic nominee, former district attorney Rob Wallace, 57%–38%. Mullin was the first Republican to represent the district since Tom Coburn in 2001.

2014 

In 2014, Mullin was reelected with 70% of the vote, defeating Democrat Earl Everrett who got 24.6% of the vote.

2016 

In the June 2016 Republican primary, Mullin defeated Jarrin Jackson by 27 percentage points. In the November general election, he defeated Democrat Joshua Harris-Till by 47 percentage points.

2018 

When he first ran for Congress in 2012, Mullin promised to serve only three terms (six years), but in July 2017 he released a video announcing that he would run for a fourth term in 2018, saying he was ill-advised when he made the promise to only serve three terms. After he reneged on this promise, former U.S. senator Tom Coburn said he would work to oust Mullin from office. Mullin won a four-way Republican primary with 54% of the vote, and was reelected in November with 65% of the vote.

2020 

In 2020, Mullin won the Republican primary with 79.9% of the vote, and was reelected in November with 75% of the vote.

Tenure

In April 2017, Mullin drew criticism when he was recorded during a town hall meeting telling his constituents that it was "bullcrap" that taxpayers pay his salary. He said, "I pay for myself. I paid enough taxes before I got here and continue to through my company to pay my own salary. This is a service. No one here pays me to go." As of 2022, Mullin still collects the U.S. Congress base salary of $174,000.

In a 2018 report, the U.S. House Ethics Committee said that “Mullin made a good faith effort to seek the Committee’s informal guidance on numerous issues with respect to his family business.” But the committee noted that Congressional ethics rules state that members of Congress should not endorse products or services, particularly if they personally benefit financially from the endorsement.

Along with all other Senate and House Republicans, Mullin voted against the American Rescue Plan Act of 2021. In August 2022, he came out against President Joe Biden's student loan forgiveness plan, but subsequently received criticism after the White House Twitter account pointed out that Mullin had benefited from $1.4 million of federal PPP loan forgiveness. Mullin also voted against the TRUTH Act (H.R. 6782), a bill that would have required public disclosure of companies that received funds through the bailout program.

January 2021 Capitol attack
During the January 6 United States Capitol attack, Mullin and Representatives Troy Nehls (a former Sheriff and Army veteran) and Pat Fallon (an Air Force veteran) helped U.S. Capitol Police build barricades and protect the doors to the House chamber from the rioters. He and many of his colleagues were later ushered to a secure location, where he declined offers to wear a mask, in violation of House rules. Mullin said that he witnessed the shooting of Trump supporter Ashli Babbitt during the attack, which occurred after she climbed through a barricade leading towards the House Chamber; Mullin's viewpoint was that the Capitol police officer "didn't have a choice" but to shoot, and that this action "saved people's lives", with members of Congress and their staff "in danger" from the "mob".

August 2021 Afghanistan visit 
On August 30, 2021, during the final days of the U.S. withdrawal from Afghanistan, Mullin asked officials of the U.S. embassy in Tajikistan for assistance in going to Afghanistan to retrieve five American citizens. Because the plan involved violations of Tajikistan currency restrictions, the embassy staffers refused. The U.S. State Department had warned Mullin not to try his own rescue of Americans in Afghanistan, and House Speaker Nancy Pelosi and House Republican Leader Kevin McCarthy had both urged members of Congress to avoid travel to Afghanistan during the final days of the U.S. military presence.

Committee assignments
 Committee on Armed Services 
 Subcommittee on Airland 
 Subcommittee on Emerging Threats and Capabilities
 Subcommittee on Readiness and Management Support
Committee on Environment and Public Works 
Committee on Health, Education, Labor, and Pension 
Committee on Indian Affairs

Caucus memberships
 Republican Study Committee
 Congressional Western Caucus

U.S. Senate

Elections

2022 Special 

In February 2022, U.S. Senator Jim Inhofe announced he would resign from his seat at the end of the 117th United States Congress on January 3, 2023, necessitating a special election to fill the remainder of his term. Mullin announced that he would run in the special election.

In a field of 13 candidates that included Scott Pruitt and Nathan Dahm, Mullin received the most votes, with 44%, but short of the 50% required to avoid a runoff. He faced former state House Speaker T. W. Shannon, who received 18%, in the runoff election on August 23. Mullin defeated Shannon in the runoff, and faced the Democratic nominee, former Oklahoma's 5th congressional district Congresswoman Kendra Horn, in the November 8 general election; Mullin defeated Horn with 61.8% of the vote.

Political positions

Regulation of mixed martial arts 
Mullin wants to extend federal boxing regulations to the practices of mixed martial arts businesses like Ultimate Fighting Champion. His 2016 proposed legislation would have forced the UFC to share financial information with fighters and create an independent ranking system. Mullin reportedly plans to reintroduce the Ali Expansion Act as a senator in 2023.

2020 presidential election results
In December 2020, Mullin was one of 126 Republican members of the House of Representatives to sign an amicus brief in support of Texas v. Pennsylvania, a lawsuit filed at the United States Supreme Court contesting the results of the 2020 presidential election, in which Joe Biden defeated incumbent Donald Trump. The Supreme Court declined to hear the case on the basis that Texas lacked standing under Article III of the Constitution to challenge the results of an election held by another state.

When campaigning for the 2022 United States Senate special election in Oklahoma, Mullin supported the claim that the 2020 election was stolen from Donald Trump.

Abortion 
Mullin supports making abortion illegal in all circumstances, even in cases of rape, incest, or if the mother's life is at risk. During the 2022 Republican runoff debate, he claimed that if his wife's life were at risk during a pregnancy, neither he nor his wife would want to get an abortion.

LGBT issues 
On December 10, 2020, Mullin and Representative Tulsi Gabbard introduced the Protect Women's Sports Act, a bill to define Title IX protections on the basis of an individual's biological sex, making it a violation for institutions that receive federal funding to "permit a person whose biological sex at birth is male to participate in an athletic program or activity that is designated for women or girls". This bill would effectively ban many transgender athletes from participating in programs corresponding with their gender identity.

Personal life
Mullin and his wife, Christie Renee Rowan, live in Westville, a few miles from the Arkansas border, and have six children, including twin girls adopted in August 2013.

Between November 2006 and April 2007, Mullin fought in three mixed martial arts fights, winning all three. His total fight time was less than 10 minutes, and he fought a total of less than three full rounds. 

Mullin is an enrolled citizen of the Cherokee Nation. He is one of five Native Americans who served in the 117th Congress. The others were Tom Cole (Chickasaw Nation), Yvette Herrell (Cherokee Nation), Sharice Davids (Ho-Chunk Nation), and Alaska Native Mary Peltola (Yup'ik). He is the first Native American senator elected to Congress in nearly two decades, and the second Cherokee Nation citizen elected to the Senate, alongside Robert Latham Owen, who was a senator for Oklahoma from 1907 to 1925.

In 2021, Mullin's personal assets were reportedly between $31.6 million and $75.6 million.

Electoral history

2012

2014

2016

2018

2020

2022

References

External links

 U.S. Senator Markwayne Mullin official U.S. Senate website
 Markwayne Mullin for Senate
 
 
 Professional mixed martial arts record on Sherdog.com
 

|-

|-

|-

|-

1977 births
20th-century Native Americans
21st-century American politicians
21st-century Native Americans
American athlete-politicians
American male mixed martial artists
American Pentecostals
American plumbers
American talk radio hosts
Businesspeople from Tulsa, Oklahoma
Cherokee Nation businesspeople
Cherokee Nation members of the United States House of Representatives
Cherokee Nation members of the United States Senate
Cherokee Nation sportspeople
Discrimination against LGBT people in the United States
Living people
Mixed martial artists from Oklahoma
Native American Christians
Native American members of the United States Congress
Oklahoma Republicans
Oklahoma State University alumni
People from Adair County, Oklahoma
People from Westville, Oklahoma
Politicians from Tulsa, Oklahoma
Radio personalities from Oklahoma
Ranchers from Oklahoma
Republican Party members of the United States House of Representatives from Oklahoma
Republican Party United States senators from Oklahoma